Maple slaw (also called sled dog slaw in parts of Canada) is a Canadian variation of coleslaw consisting of maple syrup, cabbage, onion, fish, and seasoning.

Variations 

Maple slaw is served as a snack or dessert depending on the sweetness of the ingredients used. There are some variations of the recipe which include the addition of ingredients such as cheese, sugar, apple cider, honey or spice cereal, and chocolate.

See also
 List of salads

References 
Cobb Coleslaw Salad with Maple Dressing  published on the Government of Ontario website Foodland Ontario
Vermont Public TV: Maple Pork Medallions & Maple Coleslaw 

Canadian cuisine
Salads
Vegetable dishes
Brassica oleracea dishes
Cabbage dishes